The 2015 Hwaebul Cup was the third edition of the Hwaebul Cup (홰불, Torch) celebrating North Korea's Youth Day. The competition was held between 27 July and 28 August 2013, with all matches played at the Rungrado 1st of May Stadium in P'yŏngyang. The competition was arranged in two phases, a group stage followed by a single-elimination play-off semi-finals, and a single-game final.

Group stage
A total of fourteen teams took part in the tournament, divided into two groups. Group A included Amrokkang, April 25, Kyŏnggong'ŏp, Myohyangsan, Sŏnbong and two other clubs, whilst Group B included Hwaebul, Kigwancha, Ponghwasan, Wŏlmido and three other clubs.

Group A
Table based on known results. The first- and second-placed teams advanced to the semi-finals. Kyŏnggong'ŏp and April 25 advanced to the semi-finals.

Known results

Group B
Table based on known results. The first- and second-placed teams advanced to the semi-finals. Wŏlmido and Kigwancha advanced to the semi-finals.

Known results

Knock-out stage

Semi-finals
Kyŏnggong'ŏp and April 25 qualified for the semi-finals from Group A, and Wŏlmido and Kigwancha from Group B; the first-place finisher of each group played the second-place team from the other group. Kigwancha held out for a 3-2 win over Kyŏnggong'ŏp to advance to the final, whilst April 25 earned a solid 2-0 victory over Wŏlmido to earn their spot in the final.

Third-place match
Kyŏnggong'ŏp defeated Wŏlmido to secure third place, but the match score is unknown.

Final
Kigwancha and April 25 advanced to the final, which was played at the Rungrado 1st of May Stadium on 28 August. Kigwancha fought hard early on to try to gain the initiative and took an early 1-0 lead, but April 25 soon asserted their dominance, and overwhelmed Kigwancha to win their third straight Hwaebul Cup title with a 5-1 score.

References

DPR Korea Football League seasons
1
Korea
Korea
Hwaebul Cup